The Freedom Theatre (Arabic: مسرح الحرية) is a Palestinian community-based theatre and cultural center in the Jenin refugee camp in the northern part of the West Bank. 

Established in 2006, the theatre aims to generate cultural resistance through the fields of popular culture and art as a catalyst for social change in the occupied Palestinian territories. The theatre's goals are to "develop a vibrant and creative artistic community [that] empowers children and young adults to express themselves freely and equally through art [while] emphasizing professionalism and innovation." The theatre teaches courses in film, photography, creative writing, and theatre.

Background

The Freedom Theatre is located in the Jenin refugee camp, which was established in 1953 in the municipal boundaries of the city of Jenin to house residents from the Carmel region of Haifa after the founding of the State of Israel in 1948. The theatre was inspired by Care and Learning, a project established during the First Intifada in response to the chronic fear, depression, and post-traumatic stress disorder experienced by children in the Jenin refugee camp as a result of the violence of the uprising. Arna Mer Khamis, an Israeli political and human rights activist, created the project to support the education of children in the West Bank. In the 1980s, Mer Khamis established several educational centers in the Jenin refugee camp, one of which was a small community theatre called "Stone Theatre." Located on the top floor of a local family house, the theatre was destroyed by an Israeli bulldozer during the 2002 Battle of Jenin resulting in the deaths of several of Mer Khamis' students.

Years later, Zakaria Zubeidi, a former student of the Stone Theatre, contacted Mer Khamis' son, Juliano Mer Khamis and suggested that they set up a drama project for the new generation of young people. Joined by Swedish activist Jonatana Stanczak, they opened the Freedom Theatre in 2006 as a venue to "join the Palestinian people in their struggle for liberation with poetry, music, theatre, cameras." According to Juliano Mer Khamis, the goal of the theatre is to create an artistic movement dedicated to eradicating discrimination and violence. He explains the theatre's mission within the Palestinian resistance movement by stating:

We are not trying to heal their violence. We try to challenge it into more productive ways. And more productive ways are not an alternative to resistance. What we are doing in the theatre is not trying to be a replacement or an alternative to the resistance of the Palestinians in the struggle for liberation, just the opposite. This must be clear.

The theatre uses drama, role-playing, music, dance, and art to help students express their frustrations and act out their every day struggles.

Juliano Mer Khamis 
On 4 April 2011, Juliano Mer Khamis was killed by a masked gunman near the Freedom Theatre and was pronounced dead en route to the hospital. The murder remains unsolved despite being investigated by four separate authorities: the Israeli police, the Palestinian police, the Israeli Defense Forces (IDF), and Shin Bet. Speculation over the motivation behind his death has garnered media attention at the local and international level generating several theories as to the identity of the murderer.

Mer Khamis was not always viewed favourably by Palestinians or Israelis. Some Palestinian conservatives considered his liberal views corrupted youth in the camp, while some right-wing Israelis saw him as a traitor and an agent of Palestinian resistance. However, he believed that his work in the theatre was a means of implementing and teaching universal values of freedom that were separate from any political agenda. Within the theatre, Mer Khamis' legacy continues through his students, audiences, and admirers. Recently the theatre's youth acting group wrote and performed an original play called Stolen Dreams an homage to his legacy as a "symbol of culture."

Creative activism in Palestine

David A. McDonald argues that Palestinians have used art and popular culture for at least part of the last 70 years as a means of socio-political resistance against Israeli occupation. In his view, newly established cultural organizations in Palestine continue this legacy by serving as models for civil, non-violent resistance to Israeli occupation while fostering a Palestinian collective identity. Cultural organizations act as a means for youth to express themselves through the fields of popular culture and art [providing them] a constructive outlet for dealing with feelings of loss [and] depression. Rochelle Davis asserts that Palestinian cultural production employs the politics of their own particular era [and] provides an outlet for individual expression of emotion and the search for solace. She argues that the power of art forms, such as poetry and music is in its ability to engage the population and energize it.

Culture and power

Swedenburg and Stein (2005) insist that popular culture in Palestine and Israel must be understood as fundamentally one of politics and power. Adopting the approaches set forth by scholars such as, Antonio Gramsci and Stuart Hall, they assert that culture must be seen in the context of resistance against hegemonic discourses and resistance to commonsense interpretations of the world. They find that the relative importance of culture lies in its perceived ability to reflect the political conditions in which it operates and its ability to function as both an instrument in service of or in resistance to the hegemonic political order. Therefore, they advocate for new scholarship that uses popular culture as a point of analysis in order to present alternative narrative to the existent dominant discourses put forth by scholars and others regarding Palestine and Israel.

Identity formation

Swedenburg and Stein (2005) argue that individuals negotiate and construct identity through cultural production. Julie M. Norman (2009) contends that this construction occurs through a process of self-expression and identity exploration whereby youth develop individual agency and empowerment. She argues that participation in creative activism gives individuals a more active voice in their local communities and proactive roles in sociopolitical movements. This is done through the "exploration of collective identity, that enhance social cohesion and facilitates conversations, events, and forums."

Cultural space

Julie M. Norman (2009) argues that through the provision of safe spaces, youth are able to create alternative narrative whereby they can challenge dominant discourses of the Israeli-Palestinian conflict both on a global and international level. David A. McDonald (2006) offers the example of public performances as a method in which cultural spaces are created for the construction of a shared Palestinian national identity. He asserts that on the stage Palestinian artists offer "an alternative aesthetic reality where Palestine, as cultural symbol, may be actualized in performance."

Limitations and challenges

According to David A. McDonald (2006), the emergence of a middle-class Palestinian taste concerned with "cosmopolitan aesthetics," which values presentational art forms as opposed to the preservation of "traditional culture," has led to intra-Palestinian debates over matters of authentic art. He argues that these conflicts reflect the limitations of cultural institutions to transcend beyond class and social formations and achieve desired social impacts. This in turn leads cultural organizations to struggle to overcome both Israeli and Palestinian sociopolitical obstacles.

Julie Hackman (2013) presents three potential challenges regarding the Freedom Theatre's initiatives and goals within the Jenin Refugee Camp. First, Hackman addresses the intra-organizational conflicts among the leaders, the organizations inability to maintain a non-violent discipline, and the involvement of international actors in the activities of the theatre.

Organization's programs

The theatre offers youth within the camp an introduction to theatre and acting through a drama workshop program. It also offers a three-year professional educational program in theatre, with a focus on acting. The program familiarizes students with several methods and approaches of acting from around the world and prepares them for a future career in the performing arts. According to Juliano Mer Khamis, the organization had no intention of creating a professional school and initially intended to use drama as a tool for overcoming the emotional and psychological trauma of occupation. The drama therapy program was meant to encourage students to share their experiences and face their issues with trained practitioners. Currently, the drama therapy program explores various pedagogical approaches to applied drama including theatre of the oppressed, playback theatre, drama therapy, psychodrama, therapeutic spiral model, drama in education and sociodrama.

Theatrical productions

The Freedom Theatre produced several adaptations of famous plays such as George Orwell's Animal Farm (2009), Ghassan Khanafani's Men in the Sun (2010), and Lewis Carroll's Alice in Wonderland (2011). The plays are often a reflection, critique, and realistic portrayal of Palestinian society and occupation. The theatre has also produced several original plays such as Fragments of Palestine, Sho Kman (what else?), and Stolen Dreams.

In 2013, the theatre toured several U.S. college campuses performing an adaptation of the South African anti-apartheid play The Island. Inspired by a true story, the play takes place in a prison cell and tells the story of two cellmates, one of whom is soon to be released while the other is serving a life sentence. During the day, the two engage in mind-numbing labor while at night they rehearse for a performance of Sophocles' Antigone. The Island sheds light on occupation, apartheid, freedom, and brotherhood and is described as a "testament to the resiliency of the human heart." It questions obedience, the established order, the notions of guilt and punishment. The Freedom Theatre describes the play as a "testament to the importance of culture as a tool for resistance and for humanity. Despite the prisoners' circumstances their souls are thirsty and art is the water that keeps them alive. In Palestine, as in apartheid South Africa, we need to keep ourselves alive." The play performed to sold-out audiences at the University of Connecticut, Brown, and Georgetown and the New York Theatre Workshop. In addition to the U.S., the play has also been performed in Sweden and Brazil.

Productions

References

External links
The Freedom Theatre official site

Jenin Governorate
Second Intifada
Theatre in the State of Palestine
Theatres completed in 2006